Tangko is a somewhat divergent Ok language of Kawemaot village, West Papua.

References

Languages of western New Guinea
Ok languages